The Other Side of Sunday is a 1996 Norwegian film directed by Berit Nesheim, starring Marie Theisen and Bjørn Sundquist. The film was the most-viewed film in Norway in 1996 and was nominated for an Academy Award for Best Foreign Language Film in 1997.

Cast
 Marie Theisen as Maria
 Hildegun Riise as Mrs. Tunheim
 Bjørn Sundquist as Johannes, her Father
 Sylvia Salvesen as Moren
 Martin Dahl Garfalk as Olav
 Ina Sofie Brodahl as Anna
 Ann Kristin Rasmussen as Birgit

Production
When this movie was nominated for an Oscar in the category "best foreign language film", Marie Theisen, who was 15 years old during filming, said that she realized her full nude swimming scene was difficult to accept for the American audience, but she thought it was well done and absolutely necessary for the context.

See also
 List of submissions to the 69th Academy Awards for Best Foreign Language Film
 List of Norwegian submissions for the Academy Award for Best Foreign Language Film

References

External links 

1996 films
1996 drama films
Norwegian drama films
1990s Norwegian-language films
Films about religion
Films set in the 1950s
Films directed by Berit Nesheim
1996 in Norwegian cinema